Lucia is a 2013 Indian Kannada-language psychological thriller drama film written, co-edited and directed by Pawan Kumar. It stars Sathish Ninasam and Sruthi Hariharan in lead roles.

The film's plot is about Nikki, an usher in theatre who has insomnia. After consuming a special pill, he gets entangled in a different kind of dream. Lucia was the first Kannada film to be crowdfunded by the people. The film's soundtrack was composed by Poornachandra Tejaswi and cinematography was handled by Siddhartha Nuni.

Lucia premiered at the London Indian Film Festival on 20 July 2013. It won the Best Film Audience Choice award at the festival. It was also among the films shortlisted by the FFI to become India's submission for Academy Award for Best Foreign Language Film for the year 2013. 

The film was also remade in Tamil as Enakkul Oruvan in 2015. The movie was credited for inspiring a new wave in the Kannada film industry.

Plot 

There are two main roles, one that is played out in the dream, and the other one, in reality, called respectively Nikhil and Nikki. The plot starts with the protagonist being in a state of coma and continuing only on life support. The film, from the beginning, tells two stories of the same person, one in colour and the other in black and white.

Sanjay, a detective from the Mumbai police Crime Branch starts investigating the incident that caused the protagonist's (Sathish Ninasam) current state. While Sanjay is going through the protagonist's belongings he stumbles upon some scribbled notes and a mysterious pill. Meanwhile, the police capture two suspects and interrogate them.

The story starts with Nikki in a village near Mandya, working as an usher/"torch-shiner" in a Bengaluru movie theatre owned by Shankranna (Achyuth Kumar). Nikki has insomnia and yearns for a companion. On one of his sleepless nights, Nikki is contacted by a drug dealer who gives him Lucia pills as a solution to his sleeping problems. This drug is said to have the capacity to help one dream the life they want but has the side-effect that upon discontinuation the same dreams turn into nightmares.

With the help of the Lucia pills, Nikki starts seeing himself as being a successful actor called Nikhil surrounded by people he knows in the real world. Film actor Nikhil's life is depicted in black-and-white. Shankranna, the owner of the theater where Nikki works, had starred in a film in his youth funded by the leader of some goons who now want Shankranna to sign off his theatre for his debt. More events from the dream are followed by similar events in reality as Nikki falls in love with Shwetha (Sruthi Hariharan) who is a model in the dream and a waitress in reality.

In the dream, Nikhil and Shwetha hit it off easily at the beginning but later friction arises when Nikhil expresses his discontent about Shwetha working in the film industry. Meanwhile, in reality, Nikki struggles to win Shwetha's heart, who rejects him first due to his low salary but later falls for his humble character. Shwetha's attempts to get Nikki educated and lead him to find a better paying job turns out to be futile and also result in the death of Shankranna in the hands of goons. Frustrated, Nikki chooses to leave Shwetha and continue to work in the theatre, despite the threats. Nikki redecorates the theatre and releases Shankranna's film to the audience. He later reconciles with Shwetha, who agrees to marry him.

In the dream, Shankranna is kidnapped, and Nikhil rescues him with the help of the police. In the process, all of the goons are either arrested or killed except for the contract killer. Nikhil feels Shankranna is not safe with him and decides to fire him. Nikhil breaks up with Shwetha and sends off all his servants so as to be alone. Later, a visibly disturbed Nikhil finds himself in a trashed room. Nikhil gets hold of a torch and through its light sees his life as a "torch-shiner" projected on the walls of the room.

Shwetha is now distraught with being in the limelight and understands what Nikhil had tried to tell her. Nikhil, the actor, meets Shwetha and tells her that he cannot decide if the present moment is a dream or reality but he is ultimately happy. Asking Shwetha to close her eyes, Nikhil jumps off the roof to the confusion of everyone present, including the contract killer waiting to kill him.

At present, Sanjay with the help of the suspects performs a sting operation on the drug dealer and learns more about the Lucia pills. Meanwhile, Shwetha is caught in an attempt to kill Nikhil by pulling him off life support. During her interrogation, the whole investigating team along with Shwetha watches a re-run of an interview of the film star Nikhil. In the interview, Nikhil expresses his dissatisfaction of the stardom and reveals that he is actually color blind from an accident in his childhood. He tells the interviewer that he dreams of being a normal person and in fact, in one of his dreams he is a "torch-shiner" who gets no attention from people and is happily in love with the dream of his life. It also revealed that Nikhil and Nikki both had insomnia and both consumed the Lucia pill.
 
Sanjay is now convinced that Nikhil is living in his own version of reality and chose to live in that dream rather than in the real world by attempting suicide. Sanjay gets Shwetha to act and behave like she was in Nikhil's dream, and acts himself as if he was a contract killer and shoots the comatose Nikhil in the head with an empty gun. Simultaneously, Nikhil, aware and alive in his dream world finds everything disappearing around him and is killed by a shot to the head. Nikhi wakes up from his coma to see the astonished doctors and Shwetha's relieved face. Thus, revealing that the character Nikki was an illusion whereas Nikhil was reality.

At the end, we can see Nikhil, Swetha and Shankaranna (who was dead in Nikhil's dream) enjoying pizza (Swetha worked as pizza waitress in Nikhil's dream) while they operate the projector of an old theater. Thus revealing that it was film star Nikhil's dream to be a commoner like Nikki, and he achieved it through Lucid dreams.

Cast

 Sathish Ninasam as Nikki/Nikhil
 Sruthi Hariharan as Shwetha
 Achyuth Kumar as Shankranna
 Balaji Manohar
 Hardika Shetty as Kamini
 Bharath
 Satish Kumar
 Sanjay as Sanjay (Mumbai police)
Rishab Shetty as a police constable
  Krishna as Deepak (Crime branch officer)
 Aaryan Achukatla as Aryan (second lead/model)
 Poorna
 Ram Manjjonaath as a lawyer
Prashanth Siddi as a suspect
 Pia

Production
In December 2011 Pawan Kumar announced on the Web that his next project, after the success of his directorial debut film Lifeu Ishtene, was going to be Lucia. For the next two months, he met quite a few producers and top actors and found it difficult to fund his film. That led Pawan Kumar to write a post titled Making Enemies on his blog. Three days after it was published, the response was so overwhelming that he decided to pitch the idea of inviting people to produce the film and Pawan Kumar initiated Project Lucia. Aditya Vikram Thoomati was crucial in making the bandwagon work. Fellow writer to Pawan , a newbie to Kannada cinema , Sai Prasad did his writing expertise through it. Lucia is notable for its use of crowdfunding. It was funded by 110 investors who contributed to the project through a Facebook page and a blog run by director-actor Pawan Kumar. It was the first Kannada movie to bypass the traditional film financing model. The director initially offered the lead role to model turned actor Diganth but he was later replaced by Sathish Ninasam, who has played supporting roles in many Kannada films. Actor Sathish Ninasam along with the music director Poornachandra Tejaswi visited colleges in Davangere to promote Lucia.

Soundtrack

The music for the film and soundtracks were composed by debutant Poornachandra Tejaswi, and background score composed by Poornachandra Tejaswi, Monish Kumar M.K. and Santhosh Narayanan. The lyrics were penned by Poornachandra Tejaswi, Yogaraj Bhat and Raghu Shastri. The album has seven tracks.

Release
The trailer of Lucia was released in February 2013, with the film releasing on 6 September 2013. PVR released the film on 6 September 2013 under their "Director’s Rare" category all over India. It was released across Bangalore, Chennai, Kochi, Hyderabad, Mumbai, Pune, Ahmedabad, Surat, and Delhi with English subtitles. Lucia was also set to be released in Pakistan.

Critical reception

The critics praised the film. Anurag Kashyap tweeted "My birthday gift to myself would be lucia...". Actor Siddharth was "blown away" after watching the movie. He immediately called the director Pawan Kumar and praised him. Lucia was also in the race for India's official entry to the Oscars.

The movie received positive reviews from critics. Well-known critic Baradwaj Rangan remarked, "An entertaining new Kannada film pushes the envelope even as it pays homage to the old way of doing things".  Bookmyshow website said it is a landmark film for Indian cinema. Tribune praised the film story. The Hindu stated that Lucia is a new type of Kannada film.

Box office

Awards
 Karnataka State Film Awards 2013
 Best Music Director — Poornachandra Tejaswi

61st Filmfare Awards South
 Best Director — Pawan Kumar
 Best Supporting Actor — Achyuth Kumar 
 Best Male Playback Singer — Poornachandra Tejaswi – "Thinbedakammi"

London Indian Film Festival 2013
 Audience Choice Award

Karnataka International Music Awards
 Best Background Score — Poornachandra Tejaswi, Monish Kumar M. K., Santhosh Narayanan

 3rd South Indian International Movie Awards
 Best Cinematographer — Siddhartha Nuni (Nominated)
 Best Director - Pawan Kumar

Influences and cultural references
Director Pawan Kumar admitted to have taken influence from Christopher Nolan and David Lynch. The dream and real sequences being shot in monochrome and in color to differentiate between the two stories, like the Memento and Open Your Eyes to alternate between two plot-lines. The movie's relation with dream and reality and the interrelation between the two. There is also a scene where Nolan's movie Following is seen playing on a TV screen. Requiem for a Dream is also seen playing on a TV in the same scene which is also an influence as the movie deals with addiction. Apart from the cinematic influences, the theme of dream and illusion is also shown as an influence of the poem Nee Mayeyolago by Kanaka Dasa which is quoted at the beginning of the movie. The poem is also partially contained in the lyrics of the song Nee Toreda Galigeyali in the soundtrack.

Home media
The film was released in Blu-ray, HD DVD, DVD 5.1, VCD Version From Anand Video Studio. It is the first Kannada film to be released in Blu-ray. The director, an advocate of alternative distribution strategies for indie filmmakers, was recently quoted as saying, "It’s time to set up your own virtual movie theaters on the World Wide Web which will be open 24×7 across the globe."

See also
Open Your Eyes (1997 film)

References

External links
 

2013 films
2010s Kannada-language films
Indian independent films
Crowdfunded films
Kannada films remade in other languages
Indian psychological thriller films
Films about dreams
Indian nonlinear narrative films
Films about actors
Indian avant-garde and experimental films
2010s avant-garde and experimental films